The All-Ireland Rugby League Championship (now the McGettigans All-Ireland League for sponsorship reasons) was first played for in 1997 under the title All-Ireland Challenge Cup. Since then it has also been known as the All-Ireland League, Elite League and the All-Ireland Championship. It is a rugby league competition involving teams from Ireland.

History 

The first domestic rugby league club in Ireland were the Dublin Blues Rugby League who were founded in 1989 by Brian Corrigan a club that was primarily used by union players to stay fit during the off season, playing against touring British amateur teams. Following the formation of the Ireland national side in 1995 a league competition was mooted to aid further development. So in 1997 the first Rugby League tournament began in Ireland. Under the title All-Ireland Challenge Cup eight clubs,  Belfast Buccaneers ,  Tallaght Tigers ,  Churchtown Warriors ,  East Coast Panthers  from Bray,  Bangor Vikings ,  Dublin Blues ,  Northside Saints  and  Cork Bulls  chased the first ever title. Fittingly the oldest club Dublin Blues lifted the trophy. Northside Saints from Dublin won the following season before Dublin Blues won the title for the second and so far last time. 2000 brought victory for another Dublin club in Churchtown Warriors before Cork Bulls briefly ended the Dubliners dominance. Dublin City Exiles won the first of two consecutive titles, both against Dublin Blues in 2002.  Clontarf Bulls  were a surprise winner in 2004, the next campaign saw the emergence of Treaty City Titans from Limerick as a truly dominant force they would go on and win six of the next seven championships, many of which saw them go undefeated. In the season they didn't win they were runner-up to  Carlow Crusaders  in 2008 a side they had beaten in the previous three finals. During this time as the sport grew the league changed from regional leagues Leinster and Munster into a top division Elite League underpinned by local leagues. By 2010 regional leagues were brought back followed by a series of play-offs. On the field  Country Cowboys  won their first title in 2012, it was back to the norm in 2013 as  Treaty City Titans  lifted their 7th title. The Titans had to settle for runners-up the next season as  Barnhall Butchers  won for the first time.  Treaty City Titans  after an indifferent campaign won again in 2015 and in 2016 we were guaranteed a new name on the trophy as debutant finalists  Galway Tribesmen  overcame 2012 runners-up  Ballynahinch Rabbitohs

Current clubs 2022

RLI Mens Premiership

RLI Mens Championship

Past winners 

 1997 - Dublin Blues Rugby League
 1998 - Northside Saints
 1999 - Dublin Blues Rugby League
 2000 - Churchtown Warriors
 2001 - Cork Bulls
 2002 - Dublin City Exiles
 2003 - Dublin City Exiles
 2004 - Clontarf Bulls
 2005 - Treaty City Titans
 2006 - Treaty City Titans
 2007 - Treaty City Titans
 2008 - Carlow Crusaders
 2009 - Treaty City Titans
 2010 - Treaty City Titans
 2011 - Treaty City Titans
 2012 - Country Cowboys
 2013 - Treaty City Titans
 2014 - Barnhall Butchers
 2015 - Treaty City Titans
 2016 - Galway Tribesmen
 2017 - Longhorns RL
 2018 - Longhorns RL
 2019 - Longhorns RL
 2020 - Longhorns RL
 2021 - Galway Tribesmen
 2022 - Belfast Stags

Women's competition 
Winners:

2021 - Dublin City Exiles

See also

Rugby league in Ireland
List of rugby league competitions

References

External links

Rugby league in Ireland
Sports leagues in Ireland
European rugby league competitions
Professional sports leagues in Ireland